Temple of Blood is an American Christian metal band based out of Huntsville, Alabama. Musically, they are influenced by the thrash metal music of bands like Annihilator and Megadeth and the traditional heavy metal music by bands such as Iron Maiden and Judas Priest.

History

Early years 
Temple of Blood formed in late 2001 as a power trio consisting of chief songwriter Jim Mullis on lead vocals and guitar, Garth Lovvorn on bass guitar and backing vocals, and Lance Wright on drums. At that time they mostly played cover songs from bands like Megadeth, Annihilator, Death, Iron Maiden as they developed their musical abilities. Impressed by the band's sound and ability, Jim's college friend Matt Barnes moved from New Hampshire to Alabama to join the band on second guitar. The band continued playing regional shows for a few years as they developed original songs, opening for acts such as Origin and Epoch of Unlight.

Prepare for the Judgement of Mankind 
In 2006 they released their first album Prepare for the Judgement of Mankind which was received with much critical acclaim. Terrorizer called the release "impressive" and said "[Temple of Blood] certainly have the power of the Lord coursing through their frantically fretting fingertips". Brave Words & Bloody Knuckles magazine said "With no shortage of speed or great guitar work, the music is undeniably technical and well-played". Heaven's Metal opined: "I like this disc a whole lot, the guitar riffs are fun, the music is intense and, with the exception of a couple of lackluster tunes the songs on here just crush." Metal Rules called the release "... damn fine quality thrash metal ... like the big 4 used to play.".

The album was mastered by Sterling Winfield, who had also produced releases from Pantera and King Diamond. The final track on the debut album is a cover of the Deadly Blessing song "Deliver Us From Evil". The song features a special guest, Ski, who himself was the singer for Deadly Blessing and has formed his own band called Faith Factor. Ski had applied to replace the departed Rob Halford in Judas Priest when Halford left the band in 1993. The album has been re-released by Alone Records.

After the release of "Prepare", Lovvorn parted ways with the group and bassist James Lewis was enlisted from the Ohio progressive metal band Antithesis. Lance Wright toured with the death metal band Vile during this time.

Overlord 
The band released their second album Overlord in the spring of 2008, which also received very positive reviews from metal zines around the world. The album contains a cover version of the song "Forbidden Evil", by the Bay Area thrash band Forbidden. The album was remastered by Jamie King, who had also remastered albums for such artists as Watchtower, Cro-Mags, and Chastain, and was re-released by Alone Records. Snakepit Magazine called it an improvement over the debut: "... this album by the Alabama-based bunch simply blows away their previous one!". Heaven's Metal magazine describes the remastered Overlord album as "... an album that ranks up with the BEST of them". Metal Rules also remarked : "... an improvement in every way over PREPARE ... OVERLORD is simply a great album that all thrash fans should check out.".

Recent years 
After the release of "Overlord", James Lewis left the band, being temporarily replaced by Kelly Conlon (ex-Death) but then making way for the returning Lovvorn on bass. Lance Wright and Matt Barnes left the band. Barnes later joined the technical death metal band Monstrosity as well as Diabolic. Mullis recorded lead vocals on the Cauldron Born EP "Sword and Sorcery Heavy Metal". David Keeton joined on drums, performing regional shows, but left the band in 2020. After many years of delays, current Morbid Angel and ex-Havok drummer Scott Fuller was enlisted to record drums for their upcoming album, entitled "A Show of Force". The original lineup of the band has now reunited, with the addition of lead guitarist Harry Coleman Jr.

Members 
Current members
 Jim Mullis – vocals, guitar (2001–present) (ex-Cauldron Born)
 Garth Lovvorn – bass, backing vocals (2001–2006, 2012–present) (ex-Chaos Inception, ex-Fleshtized)
 Lance Wright – drums (2001–2016, 2022-present) (ex-Vile)
 Harry Coleman, Jr. - guitar (ex-Humanicide)

Session members
 Scott Fuller – drums (2020) (Morbid Angel, ex-Havok)
 Aurélien Gonzalez – guitar (2022) (Dead Tree Seeds)

Former members
 James "Jim" Lewis – bass (2006–2009) (ex-Antithesis)
 Matt Barnes – guitar, backing vocals (2004–2013) (Monstrosity, Diabolic)
 David Keeton – drums, backing vocals (2016–2020)
 Kelly Conlon – bass (2011) (ex-Death, ex-Monstrosity)

 Timeline

Discography 
 Prepare for the Judgement of Mankind (2005)
 Overlord (2008)

Compilation appearances 
 "Realm of Insufferable Burning (The Horrors of Hell)" on Knuckletracks Volume 96 CD (Brave Words and Bloody Knuckles, 2006)
 "Realm of Insufferable Burning (The Horrors of Hell)" on Metal Crusade Volume 12 CD (Heavy magazine, 2006)
 "Fearsome Warrior (remastered)" on Thrashmageddon Volume 1 CD (Roxx Records and Metal for a Dark World, 2013)
 "Destruction of the Twin Cities" on Light Prevails CD (Christian Rock & Fellowship, 2008)

References

External links 
 Official Homepage
 Temple of Blood at Metal Archives
 CM Nexus profile
 Temple of Blood at Nolifetilmetal.com

American Christian metal musical groups
American thrash metal musical groups
American speed metal musical groups
Heavy metal musical groups from Alabama
Musical groups established in 2001
Musical quartets